is a Japanese military science fiction novel series written by Chōhei Kambayashi. First published as a series of short stories, a collected bunkobon volume was released by Hayakawa Publishing in 1984. It was followed by two sequels, released in 1999 and 2009. A five-episode original video animation (OVA) series, produced by Gonzo and Bandai Visual, was released in Japan from August 2002 to August 2005.

The series is notable for its air combat scenes, which were created with the help of the Japan Air Self-Defense Force. The JASDF worked with the Gonzo production team by recording actual sounds of the F-15J Eagle and running test flights at Komatsu Air Base, and having discussions on air combat tactics.

In 1985, Yukikaze received the 16th Seiun Award for Best Japanese Long Work. The OVA series has twice won the Tokyo Anime Award for Original Video Animation in 2003 and 2006.

Premise
Yukikaze occurs in the early 21st century. Thirty-three years before the events of the series, an alien force known as the JAM invade Earth through a dimensional portal that appeared over Antarctica. Without alarming the general public, the United Nations establishes a defense force to oppose the threat and after a series of bloody battles, manages to push the enemy back to the other side of the portal. The UN establishes five bases on the JAM homeworld, a planet named "Fairy", to continue the offensive against the JAM with the Fairy Air Force (FAF) leading the way. The main character, Lt Rei Fukai, pilots the FFR-31MR/D Super Sylph (later the FFR-41MR Mave) fighter B-503, nicknamed "Yukikaze", an advanced armed tactical reconnaissance plane equipped with a near-sentient AI system, and belongs to the FAF's combat intelligence wing the Special Air Force (SAF)'s recon squadron, known as Boomerang Squadron. Over the course of the series, Fukai and the FAF struggles to defeat the JAM, who have perfected the art of human cloning and planted agents all over the FAF.

Characters

Rei is a 2nd Lieutenant in the FAF's Special Air Force (SAF) reconnaissance unit. He is the pilot of the B-503 "Yukikaze" fighter. Although depicted as a loner and having a tendency toward social rejection, he is good friends with Jack Bukhar and eventually interacts with other SAF pilots.

The de facto second-in-command of the SAF, Bukhar is Rei's commanding officer. Despite the seniority, he is the only person in the FAF to even befriend Fukai and help him deal with the stress of battle. A prominent theme with the character is his interest in boomerangs and their aerodynamic characteristics.

A former investment banker who signed up with the FAF during the early days of the JAM war, Cooley is a skilled player in the FAF's power struggles. She is the SAF's commander with the rank of brigadier-general.

A psychiatrist by trade, Foss is attached to the FAF and holds the rank of captain. In the series, Foss is responsible for profiling Yukikaze and diagnosing Rei Fukai after he lapsed into a quasi-comatose state when his first aircraft is destroyed. Cooley later orders her to "profile" the JAM as a single entity. Also, she's the niece of brigadier-general Rydia Cooley.

A second lieutenant of the FAF, Burgadish is assigned as the Yukikaze's flight officer following the death of Lieutenant Norman Hughes.

One of the few civilian characters in the series, Jackson is the author of The Invader, a chronicle of the FAF's struggle against the JAM. She went to Antarctica to research the book several times.

An American free columnist who travels to the FAF base on Fairy.

A Native American FAF captain. Was part of the development team that built Yukikaze's AI. Has a plutonium battery-powered artificial heart.

An FAF captain assigned to the experimental fighter Fern II.

Rombert is a colonel who leads the FAF Intelligence Division. He is determined to find out more about the JAM.

An FAF major stationed at the TAB-14 frontline base. Yazawa is actually a Jam taking a human form who attempts to extract the security code of Yukikaze from a captured Rei and Burgadish.

A nurse from the TAB-14 base. Like Yazawa, Marnie is a JAM taking a human form.

Media

Novel
Yukikaze, written by Chōhei Kanbayashi, was published a series of short stories in S-F Magazine from 1979 to 1983, and was later collected by Hayakawa Publishing in a bunkobon volume on February 1, 1984.

Viz Media licensed the first two novels for English release in North America. Yukikaze was released on January 19, 2010. Good Luck, Yukikaze was released on July 19, 2011.

Original video animation
Produced by Gonzo, Victor Entertainment and Bandai Visual to commemorate Bandai Visual's 20th anniversary. The five episode series was originally released directly to DVD as an original video animation. It was later aired in Japan on the anime television network Animax, which also aired the series on its English language networks across Southeast Asia and other networks worldwide. The series' ending theme is "RTB" by Monsieur Kamayatsu.

Yukikaze was licensed for an English language release in North America by Bandai Entertainment, and in Australia and New Zealand by Madman Entertainment. In 2018, the series and its spinoff Fighting Fantasy Girl Rescue Me: Mave-chan were streamed online by Tubi.

Episode listing
{|class="wikitable plainrowheaders" style="width:100%; margin:auto; background:#FFFFFF;"
|-
! width="30"| # !! Title !! width="150"| Release date
|-
{{Episode list
|EpisodeNumber   = 1
|Title           = Operation 1
|OriginalAirDate = 
|ShortSummary    = The human race has beaten an invasion by an alien race called the JAM back to its home planet Fairy. Fairy Air Force, the UN-mandated military organization tasked with neutralizing and eventually eliminating the alien threat, assigns an armed strategic reconnaissance aircraft codenamed "Yukikaze" and equipped with an AI to Lt. Rei Fukai of the subordinate Special Air Force with the intention to record data on JAM movements and battlefield tactics. One day, however, an encounter with the "Grey Sylph" (a JAM duplicate of the Yukikaze) lands him in hot water with his superiors. During another patrol, Fukai is captured by JAM clones wanting to study the plane. He kills one of his captors and escapes with the plane from an alien entity disguised as a FAF forward airbase but ends up being pursued and shot down by the "Grey Sylph". As the "Grey Sylph" attempts to finish off Fukai's aircraft, the Yukikaze AI hijacks an FRX-99, a prototype UCAV that was undergoing operational tests at that time, and uses it to destroy the "Grey Sylph". The AI uploads its files to the FRX-99, ejects Fukai, and obliterates Yukikaze'''s wreckage.
}}

|}

ReceptionYukikaze'' won the 16th Seiun Award for Best Japanese Long Work. The OVA series won the Tokyo Anime Award for Original Video Animation in both 2003 and 2006.

References

External links
  
 

2002 anime OVAs
Aviation comics
Bandai Entertainment anime titles
Bandai Visual
Gonzo (company)
Military anime and manga
Viz Media novels